The 1967–68 season was Stoke City's 61st season in the Football League and the 37th in the First Division.

Since gaining promotion back to the First Division in 1963, Stoke had done well and managed to consistently finish in mid-table avoiding any fears of relegation. However, in 1967–68 Stoke did have a later than expected fight against relegation and after going seven straight matches without a win towards the end of the season it looked as if Stoke were heading back to the Second Division but a thrilling 3–2 win over Leeds set Stoke up to beat Liverpool on the final day ensuring survival by three points.

Season review

League
Dennis Viollet left Stoke in May 1967 for Baltimore Bays in the United States, and Tony Waddington decided against signing a replacement, making just one transaction prior to the start of the 1967–68 season, purchasing Burnley left back Alex Elder for £50,000. Elder had a fine career at Turf Moor but at Stoke after an early injury he never produced the form expected of him and is considered to be one of Waddington's worst signings. After a decent enough start to the campaign by Christmas results did not go well at all and the side slipped down the table and into the relegation places. Results continued to be poor and after a 3–0 defeat away at West Bromwich Albion on 13 March, Stoke went and lost the next six matches.

Consequently, a lot of 'wheeling a dealing' was done in the transfer market with Alan Philpott leaving for Oldham, Maurice Setters to Coventry and the popular Calvin Palmer moving to Sunderland for £70,000. To fill the gap Waddington brought in Willie Stevenson from Liverpool for £30,000. Thanks to three fine results late on in the season, including a thrilling 3–2 win over Don Revie's Leeds and a decisive 2–1 victory over Liverpool, Stoke managed to finish in 18th place three points away from the relegation places.

FA Cup
After beating Welsh side Cardiff City in the third round Stoke were knocked out by West Ham United who won 3–0 at the Victoria Ground.

League Cup
Stoke made it through to the quarter final of the 1967–68 League Cup losing 2–0 to Leeds United at Elland Road after knocking out Watford, Ipswich Town and Sheffield Wednesday.

Final league table

Results

Stoke's score comes first

Legend

Football League First Division

FA Cup

League Cup

Friendlies

Squad statistics

References

Stoke City F.C. seasons
Stoke